Lockville may refer to:

Lockville, North Carolina
Lockville, Ohio
Lockville Historic District in Massachusetts